The Human Machine is the ninth studio album by American-Czech death metal band Master. It was released on 26 April 2010, through Pulverised Records. The album was available in a standard version and an alternate slipcase version with different artwork.

Track listing
 All songs written by Paul Speckmann, except tracks 3, 8, and 10 (lyrics: Speckmann; music: Aleš Nejezchleba)

Personnel
Master
 Paul Speckmann – bass, vocals
 Aleš Nejezchleba – guitars
 Zdeněk Pradlovský – drums

Guest
 Vlasta Killy Mahdal – backing vocals on "The Human Machine", "True Color", "Faceless Victims Expelled", and "Worship the Sun"

Production'
 Eliran Kantor – cover art
 Petr Nejezchleba – engineering
 Pavel Hlavica – engineering
 Paul Speckmann – production

References

2010 albums
Master (American band) albums
Albums with cover art by Eliran Kantor